Olearia mucronata is a species of flowering plant in the family Asteraceae and is endemic to inland areas of Western Australia. It is a densely-branched, unpleasantly aromatic shrub with crowded linear leaves, and white and yellow, daisy-like inflorescences.

Description
Both sides of the leaves are dark green with a few glandular hairs. Flowering occurs from August to January and the fruit is a slightly flattened achene, the pappus with 19 to 27 bristles.

Taxonomy
Olearia mucronata was first formally described in 1990 by Nicholas Sèan Lander in the journal Nuytsia from specimens collected in the Wittenoom area in 1972. The specific epithet (mucronata) refers to the muconate leaves.

Distribution and habitat
This daisy bush grows on schistose hills in the Muchison and Pilbara bioregions of inland Western Australia.

Conservation status
Olearia mucronata is listed as "Priority Three" by the Government of Western Australia Department of Biodiversity, Conservation and Attractions, meaning that it is poorly known and known from only a few locations but is not under imminent threat.

References

mucronata
Flora of Western Australia
Plants described in 1990